Lena is an unincorporated community located in the Municipality of Killarney-Turtle Mountain in south central Manitoba, Canada. It is located approximately 89 kilometers (55 miles) southeast of Brandon, Manitoba, at the junction of Manitoba Highway 18 and Provincial Road 341.

References

See also
 St. John–Lena Border Crossing

Unincorporated communities in Westman Region
Municipality of Killarney-Turtle Mountain